Lincoln Street/Southwest 3rd Avenue is a light rail station on the MAX Orange Line, located at 229 Southwest Lincoln Street in Portland, Oregon.

Features
Trio, a series of three mixed metal sculptures by Elizabeth Conner, was installed at the site in 2013.

The Lincoln Street/Southwest 3rd Avenue Mstation features an experimental "eco-track" with  mats of grass to create a vegetated trackway that reduces stormwater runoff. The surface, which primarily uses species from the Sedum genus of flowering plants, was installed in November 2013 by contractors Stacy and Witbeck on both sides of the station's island platform.

Bus service 
, this station is served by the following bus lines:
FX2–Division
9–Powell Blvd
17–Holgate/Broadway
43–Taylors Ferry Rd

Gallery

References

2015 establishments in Oregon
MAX Light Rail stations
MAX Orange Line
Railway stations in Portland, Oregon
Railway stations in the United States opened in 2015
Southwest Portland, Oregon